Heads Up, Charley (German: Kopf hoch, Charly!) is a 1927 German silent comedy film directed by Willi Wolff and starring Ellen Richter, Anton Pointner, and Michael Bohnen. Marlene Dietrich appears in a supporting role.

Production
The film is based on a novel by Ludwig Wolff with location shooting done in Paris, Hamburg and New York. Other scenes were shot at Berlin's EFA Studios. The film premiered on 18 March 1927 at the UFA-Theatre Kurfürstendamm in Berlin and was a box office success.

Richter's heirs later agreed to withhold the film from exhibition during Dietrich's lifetime.

Cast
 Ellen Richter as Charlotte Ditmar 
 Anton Pointner as Frank Ditmar 
 Michael Bohnen as John Jacob Bunjes 
 Max Gülstorff as Harry Mosenheim 
 Margaret Quimby as Margie Quinn 
 George De Carlton as Rufus Quinn 
 Angelo Ferrari as Marquis d'Ormesson 
 Robert Scholz as Herzog von Sanzedilla 
 Nikolai Malikoff as Prince Platonoff 
 Toni Tetzlaff as Fr. Zangenberg 
 Marlene Dietrich as Edmée Marchand 
 Blandine Ebinger as Näherin 
 Albert Paulig as Bunjes' Diener

References

Bibliography
 Bach, Steven. Marlene Dietrich: Life and Legend. University of Minnesota Press, 2011.
 Ryan, David Stuart. The Blue Angel - The Life and Films of Marlene Dietrich. Kozmik Press, 2010.

External links

1927 films
Films of the Weimar Republic
German silent feature films
German comedy films
Films directed by Willi Wolff
Films based on German novels
1927 comedy films
UFA GmbH films
German black-and-white films
Silent comedy films
1920s German films